Aşağı Şabalıd (also, Ashaga Shabalyt, Ashagy Shabalyt, and Ashagy-Shabalut) is a village and municipality in the Shaki Rayon of Azerbaijan.  It has a population of 675.

References 

Populated places in Shaki District